QLess is an American company headquartered in Pasadena, California, that produces a software-as-a-service solution for mobile queuing.

References

External links 
 

Queue management